Riverside Park is a park in Kamloops, British Columbia, Canada that encompasses a beach next to a river. The park is bordered by the Thompson River and Landsdowne Street. There is a monument in the park that indicates the height to which four different floods reached throughout the history of the park. Riverside Park also included a water park, which was torn down in 2022. There is an 11 PM curfew at the park, but it is not normally enforced. In 1885, the site that would eventually become the park was used as a campsite by Chinese Canadians from Savona's Ferry working on the Canadian Pacific Railway. When members of the On-to-Ottawa Trek stopped in Kamloops on their way from Vancouver to Ottawa, Ontario in 1935, Mayor W.J. Moffat offered the men an empty hospital to sleep in, but the men declined, many choosing rather to sleep in Riverside Park where they had only one blanket to share between three or four men. In 2011, a parking garage was proposed to be built in the park, but a group called the Friends of Riverside Park gathered signatures from more than 10% of the Kamloops electorate opposing the proposal, thereby forcing a referendum on the subject. Before the referendum could take place, however, the city council unanimously voted to put an end to the plans to build the parking garage.

References

Parks in British Columbia
Kamloops
Urban public parks in Canada
Beaches of British Columbia